Hugh Mercer (16 January 1726 – 12 January 1777) was a Scottish-born American military officer and physician who participated in the Seven Years' War and Revolutionary War. Born in Pitsligo, Scotland, he studied medicine in his home country and served with the Jacobite forces of Bonnie Prince Charlie, participating in the Battle of Culloden in 1746. With the failure of the Jacobite rising, Mercer escaped to Pennsylvania. 

There, he served alongside a young George Washington in the British colonial forces during the French and Indian War, and was seriously wounded during an engagement in September 1756. Mercer settled in Virginia, continued his work as a physician, and later became a brigadier general in the American Continental Army and close friend to George Washington. Mercer died as a result of wounds received at the Battle of Princeton in January 1777, becoming a fallen hero and rallying symbol of the American Revolution.

Early life and career
Mercer was born 16 January 1726 at Pitsligo manse, Aberdeenshire, Scotland, to Ann Monro and the Reverend William Mercer, a minister in the Church of Scotland. At 15, he began studying medicine at the University of Aberdeen's Marischal College, and subsequently graduated as a physician in 1744. He was assistant surgeon in the army of Bonnie Prince Charlie in 1745, and was present at the Battle of Culloden when Charles' army was defeated on 16 April 1746, and many survivors were hunted down and killed. As a fugitive in his homeland in 1747, Mercer fled Scotland after months in hiding. He bought his way onto a ship and moved to America, settling near what is now Mercersburg, Pennsylvania, and practiced medicine for eight years.

Seven Years' War

In 1755, when General Edward Braddock's army was cut down by the French and Indians during the first British attempt to take Fort Duquesne, Mercer was shocked by the same butchery he remembered at Culloden. He came to the aid of the wounded and eventually took up arms in support of the army that a few years prior had hunted him, this time as a soldier, not a surgeon. By 1756, he was commissioned a captain in a Pennsylvania regiment, and accompanied Lt. Col. John Armstrong's expedition on the raid of the Indian village of Kittanning in September 1756. During the attack, Mercer was badly wounded and separated from his unit. He trekked  through the woods for 14 days, injured and with no supplies, until he found his way back to Fort Shirley, where he was recognized and promoted. He rose to the rank of colonel and commanded garrisons. It was during this period that Mercer developed a lifelong and warm friendship with another colonel, George Washington.

Both Washington and Mercer served under British General John Forbes during the second attempt to capture Fort Duquesne. Forbes occupied the burned fort on 25 November 1758. Forbes immediately ordered the construction of a new fortification to be named Fort Pitt, after British Secretary of State William Pitt the Elder. He also named the settlement between the rivers "Pittsburgh", modern Pittsburgh.

Forbes's health, which had been poor for much of the campaign, began a rapid decline during his occupation of Fort Pitt. On 3 December 1758, now gravely ill, Forbes began the arduous journey back to Philadelphia leaving Colonel Hugh Mercer in command of Fort Pitt. General Forbes died in Philadelphia on 11 March 1759.

Mercer's first task was to construct a temporary fort to hold the two forks of the Ohio in case the French were able to execute their plans to return in the Spring of 1759. Drawings of the time call the temporary fortification "Mercer's Fort." It stood at the site of what is today a parking lot between Point State Park and the Pittsburgh Post Gazette Building.

After befriending several Virginia men, Mercer moved to Fredericksburg, Virginia in 1760 to begin his medical practice anew at the conclusion of the war. When Mercer arrived in Fredericksburg, it was a thriving Scottish community that must have been a happy sanctuary for a Scotsman who could never again see his homeland. He became a noted member and businessman in town, buying land and involving himself in local trade. He became a member of the Fredericksburg Masonic Lodge in 1767. Washington, who was also a member of this lodge, later became President, and at least eight members were generals of the American Revolution (Washington, Mercer, George Weedon, William Woodford, Fielding Lewis, Thomas Posey, Gustavus Wallace, and the Marquis de Lafayette, who was honorary in 1824) – far more than any other group, institution or organization save the pre-Revolution British Army. This lodge is still in existence today.

Soon afterward, Mercer opened a physician's apothecary and practice. His apothecary in Fredericksburg, Virginia is now a museum. George Washington's mother, Mary Washington, became one of Mercer's patients, and Mercer prospered as a respected doctor in the area. Mercer married Isabella Gordon and together they had five children: Ann Mercer Patton, John Mercer, William Mercer, George Weedon Mercer, and Hugh Tennant Mercer. In 1774, George Washington sold Ferry Farm, his childhood home, to Mercer, who wanted to make this prized land into a town where he and his family would settle for the remainder of his days.

During 1775, Mercer was a member of the Fredericksburg Committee of Safety, and on 25 April, he was one of the members of the Independent Company of the Town of Fredericksburg who sent a letter of concern to Colonel Washington when the British removed gunpowder from the magazine at Williamsburg. In an August vote, Mercer was excluded from the elected leadership of the new regiments formed by the Virginia Convention because he was a "northern Briton", but on 12 September, he was elected Colonel of the Minute Men of Spotsylvania, King George, Stafford, and Caroline Counties.

On 17 November 1775, Mercer was one of 21 members chosen for the Committee of Safety of Spotsylvania County. On 11 January 1776, Mercer was appointed colonel to what soon became the 3rd Virginia Regiment of the Virginia Line, and the next day, George Weedon was appointed lieutenant colonel. Future president James Monroe and future Chief Justice of the United States John Marshall also served as officers under his command. In June 1776 Mercer received a letter from the Continental Congress, signed by John Hancock, appointing him brigadier-general in the Armies of the United Colonies and requesting him to report to headquarters in New York immediately. Mercer soon left Fredericksburg to join the Continental Army.

American Revolution

Before the New York City Campaign, Washington had ordered two forts built to repel the Royal Navy. On the New York side of the Hudson River, Fort Washington was constructed, and Mercer himself oversaw the building of the earthen fortification on the New Jersey side, named Fort Lee. Though the fort was bravely defended, the British captured Fort Washington on 16 November 1776, and the Americans abandoned Fort Lee four days later. The retreat to New Jersey became known as "the Crisis of the Revolution", because the enlistments of most of Washington's soldiers ended on New Year's Day 1777.

Mercer led a raid on Richmondtown, Staten Island on October 15, 1776, temporarily securing the town and taking as prisoners those inside the makeshift hospital of St. Andrew's Church, only to be later repelled back to New Jersey, releasing the prisoners and causing numerous British casualties in the process.

There are rumors that Mercer exclusively originated Washington's plan to cross the Delaware River and surprise the Hessians at the Battle of Trenton on December 26, 1776, and Mercer was certainly a major contributor to its execution. The victory at Trenton (and a small monetary bonus) made Washington's men agree to a ten-day extension to their enlistment. When Washington decided to face off with Cornwallis during the Second Battle of Trenton on January 2, 1777, Mercer was given a major role in the defense of the city.

The next day, January 3, 1777, Washington's army was en route to Princeton, New Jersey. While leading a vanguard of 350 soldiers, Mercer's brigade encountered two British regiments and a mounted unit. A fight broke out at an orchard grove and Mercer's horse was shot from under him. Getting to his feet, he was quickly surrounded by British troops who mistook him for George Washington and ordered him to surrender. Outnumbered, he drew his saber and began an unequal contest. He was finally beaten to the ground, bayoneted repeatedly (seven times), and left for dead.

When he learned of the British attack and saw some of Mercer's men in retreat, Washington himself entered the fray. Washington rallied Mercer's men and pushed back the British regiments, but Mercer had been left on the field to die with multiple bayonet wounds to his body and blows to his head. Legend has it that a beaten Mercer, with a bayonet still impaled in him, did not want to leave his men and the battle and was given a place to rest on a white oak tree's trunk, and those who remained with him stood their ground. The tree became known as "the Mercer Oak" and is the key element of the seal of Mercer County, New Jersey.

When he was discovered, Mercer was carried to the field hospital in the Thomas Clarke House (now a museum) at the eastern end of the battlefield. Benjamin Rush cared for Mercer and other wounded troops. Rush was assisted in caring for the wounded by Quakers.
Local Quakers continued to care for wounded troops from both Continental and British forces, after the Continental Army moved North. The Quaker meeting house is adjacent to the property now known as The Princeton Battlefield State Park. Medical efforts by Rush and Mercer the care of two Quaker women, but Mercer was mortally wounded and died nine days later, on January 12, 1777. In 1840 ,he was reburied at Philadelphia's Laurel Hill Cemetery.

Because of Mercer's courage and sacrifice, Washington proceeded into Princeton and defeated the British forces there. He then moved and quartered his forces to Morristown in victory. Because of those victories, most of Washington's army re-enlisted, the French finally approved arms and supplies to the Americans and a stunned Cornwallis pulled his forces back to New York to reassess the surprising American successes. The "crisis" had ended, America had the means to fight, and British public support for the war slowly began to wane.

John Trumbull used Mercer's son, Hugh Jr., as a model for his painting The Death of General Mercer at the Battle of Princeton, January 3, 1777. A portrait by Charles Willson Peale entitled Washington at the Battle of Princeton, January 3, 1777 displays Washington in the foreground with Hugh Mercer lying mortally wounded in the background, supported by Dr. Benjamin Rush and Major George Lewis holding the American flag. This portrait is the prize possession of Princeton University. James Peale painted a version of "Battle of Princeton" whose background shows a very indistinct portrait of Mercer being helped from the ground.

Family lineage and heritage
Succeeding generations of Mercer's family have distinguished themselves. Famous direct descendants of Hugh Mercer were his grandson Virginia governor John Mercer Patton, his sons Confederate Lt. Col Waller T. Patton and Col. George Smith Patton, who in turn was an ancestor of General George S. Patton, Jr. Other direct descendants include another grandson Confederate General Hugh Weedon Mercer (CSA), songwriter Johnny Mercer, and Sergeant Christopher Mercer Lowe (US Army).

|-
|+ Notable descendants of Hugh Mercer
|-

In film
In the 2000 television film The Crossing, a dramatization of Washington's crossing of the Delaware and the battle of Trenton, Mercer is played by Roger Rees.

In popular culture
In the Broadway musical Hamilton, General Mercer is referenced by Aaron Burr in the song "The Room Where It Happens": "Did ya hear the news about good old General Mercer? You know Clermont Street? They renamed it after him. The Mercer legacy is secure."

Hugh Mercer is referenced in the A. W. Burns/George W. Hewitt song "America Shall Aye Be Free".

Namesakes
 Fort Mercer, located in Red Bank Battlefield of what is now the Borough of National Park, New Jersey, which was named in his honor.
 Mercer County, New Jersey where Trenton and Princeton are located, was named after Hugh Mercer.
 Mercer County, Pennsylvania
 Mercer County, Ohio
 Mercer County, Kentucky
 Mercer County, Illinois
 Mercer County, West Virginia
 Mercers Bottom, Mason County, West Virginia
 Mercer County, Missouri 
 The town of Mercer, Maine
 The town of Mercerville, New Jersey
 Mercer, Pennsylvania
 Mercersburg, Pennsylvania
 Mercer Street in Fredericksburg, VA
 Mercer Street in New York, NY
 Mercer Street Residence at New York University School of Law
 Hugh Mercer Elementary School in Fredericksburg, Virginia.
 Mercer Hall at the University of Mary Washington

References

Bibliography
 Goolrick, John Tackett. The life of General Hugh Mercer: with brief sketches of General George Washington, ... New York: Neale Pub. Co., 1906, 
 Kwasny, Mark V. Washington's Partisan War, 1775–1783, Kent State University Press, 1998, 
 MacDougall, Donald John. Scots and Scots' descendants in America, vol. 1, Caledonian publishing company, 1917,

External links
 Fredericksburg Masonic Lodge No. 4
 Hugh Mercer: An Unexpected Life
 Hugh Mercer Apothecary
 History Point: Central Rappahannock Regional Library
 Biography
 Fraserburgh Heritage Centre

1726 births
1777 deaths
Scottish emigrants to the Thirteen Colonies
Virginia colonial people
United States military personnel killed in the American Revolutionary War
Deaths by bayonet
Continental Army generals
Continental Army officers from Virginia
British military personnel of the French and Indian War
Alumni of the University of Aberdeen
Military personnel from Fredericksburg, Virginia
People from Aberdeenshire
18th-century American physicians
Burials at Laurel Hill Cemetery (Philadelphia)
Jacobite military personnel of the Jacobite rising of 1745
Scottish Jacobites
Scottish generals
18th-century Scottish medical doctors